The 1945 Saint Louis Billikens football team was an American football team that represented Saint Louis University as a member of the Missouri Valley Conference (MVC) during the 1945 college football season. In its sixth season under head coach Dukes Duford, the team compiled a 5–4 record (0–1 against MVC opponents), finished fourth in the conference, and outscored opponents by a total of 194 to 139. The team played its home games at Walsh Stadium in St. Louis.

Schedule

References

Saint Louis
Saint Louis Billikens football seasons
Saint Louis Billikens football